Glenea albofasciolata is a species of beetle in the family Cerambycidae. It was described by Stephan von Breuning in 1956. It is found in the Malay Peninsula.

References

albofasciolata
Beetles described in 1956